The Double, in association football, is the achievement of winning a country's top tier division and its primary cup competition in the same season. The lists in this article examine this definition of a double, while derivative sections examine much less frequent, continental instances. The Double can also mean beating a team both home and away in the same league season, a feat often noted as doing the double over a particular opponent.

The first club to achieve a double was Preston North End in 1889, winning the FA Cup and The Football League in the inaugural season of the league.

The team that holds the record for the most doubles is Linfield of Northern Ireland, with a total of 25.

Europe

Albania
In Albania, five teams have won the Double of the Kategoria Superiore and the Kupa e Shqipërisë.

Andorra
In Andorra, four teams have won the Double of the Primera Divisió and the Copa Constitució.

Armenia
Prior to the breakup of the Soviet Union, Armenian clubs were part of Soviet competition. Ararat Yerevan was one of just two non-Russian clubs to win the Soviet double, in 1973, with Nikita Simonyan at the helm. They also won the post-independence Armenian Double in 1993.

In Armenia, four teams have won the Double of the Soviet Top League/Armenian Premier League and the Soviet Cup/Armenian Independence Cup.

Austria
In Austria, nine teams have won the Double of the Austrian Bundesliga and the Austrian Cup.

Azerbaijan
In Azerbaijan, four teams have won the Double of the Azerbaijan Premier League and the Azerbaijan Cup.

Belarus
In Belarus, four teams have won the Double of the Belarusian Premier League and the Belarusian Cup.

Belgium
In Belgium, four teams have won the Double of the Belgian First Division A and the Belgian Cup.

Bosnia and Herzegovina 
In Bosnia and Herzegovina, three teams have won the Double of the First League of Bosnia and Herzegovina/Premier League of Bosnia and Herzegovina and the Bosnia and Herzegovina Football Cup.

Bulgaria
In Bulgaria, four teams have won the Double of the Bulgarian A Football Group and the Bulgarian Cup.

Croatia
In Croatia, three teams have won the Double of the Yugoslav First League/Croatian First Football League and the Yugoslav Cup/Croatian Football Cup.

Cyprus
In Cyprus, five teams have won the Double of the Cypriot First Division and the Cypriot Cup.

Czech Republic
Two teams won the Double of the Czechoslovak First League and Czechoslovak Cup. Since the dissolution of Czechoslovakia in 1993, the Double has consisted of the Czech First League and Czech Cup, being won by only two teams to date.

Denmark
In Denmark, five teams have won the Double of the Danish Superliga and the Danish Cup.

England
In England, eight teams have won the double of the Football League First Division (1888–1992)/Premier League (1992–present) and FA Cup.

Preston North End in 1889 won the double without losing a game all season. 
Manchester United won the double three times in the 1990s, including as part of a continental treble in 1998–99. 
Manchester City won the double as part of the first-ever domestic treble for an English men's football team in 2018–19.

Estonia
In Estonia, two teams have won the Double of the Meistriliiga and the Estonian Cup.

Faroe Islands
In Faroe Islands, six teams have won the Double of the Faroe Islands Premier League and the Faroe Islands Cup.

Finland
In Finland, three teams have won the Double of the Veikkausliiga and the Finnish Cup.

France
In France, 12 teams have won the Double of the Ligue 1 and the Coupe de France.

Georgia 
In Georgia, two teams have won the Double of the Georgian Premier League and the Georgian Cup.

Germany

Inter-war period 
A national cup competition was introduced in Germany in 1935, and was known as the Tschammer-Pokal for the country's then minister of sport. Between 1935 and the suspension of cup play in 1944 because of World War II, the Double was won only once.

 Schalke 04 – 1937

Bundesliga era 
Play for what had become the DFB-Pokal was resumed following the war in 1953, and up until well after the formation of the Bundesliga in 1963, no club was able to complete the double. A new cup trophy was introduced as it was felt the previous one was associated with the Nazi period.

In the modern-day Bundesliga era, the double has been won by only four clubs. Bayern Munich holds the record, with 13.

Note: Bayern Munich's 2013 and 2020 Doubles were part of the club's Trebles which also included their UEFA Champions League victories.

East Germany (defunct)
Following World War II, a separate football competition emerged in the Russian-occupied eastern area of Germany.
The first division DDR-Oberliga was active from 1947–48 to 1990–91 (not held 1960–61) and saw the introduction of the FDGB-Pokal in 1949. The cup competition was not staged in 1950–51, 1952–53 and 1960–61. Five doubles were won in East German competition:

 Dynamo Dresden (3) – 1971, 1977, 1990
 BFC Dynamo – 1988
 Hansa Rostock – 1991

Since the reunification of Germany, no former East German club has won either the Bundesliga title.

Gibraltar
In Gibraltar, seven teams have won the Double of the Gibraltar Premier Division and the Rock Cup.

Greece
In Greece, the big three of Attica and PAOK have managed to win the double of the Superleague Greece and the Greek Cup.

Hungary
In Hungary, five teams have won the Double of the Nemzeti Bajnokság I and the Magyar Kupa.

Iceland
In Iceland, five teams have won the Double of the Úrvalsdeild karla and the Icelandic Cup.

Israel
In Israel, the Double can be achieved by winning the Top division championship and the Israel State Cup. The team that has won the most doubles to date is Maccabi Tel Aviv, with seven wins, followed by their city rivals, Hapoel Tel Aviv with four wins. A total of fifteen doubles have been won.

Italy
Five Italian clubs share eleven doubles of the Serie A championship and the Coppa Italia.

Note: In 2006, Inter finished third in Serie A but were awarded the title as the highest placed club not to be involved in Calciopoli. The club's 2010 double was made the Treble with their UEFA Champions League victory.

Kazakhstan
In Kazakhstan, five teams have won the Double of the Kazakhstan Premier League and the Kazakhstan Cup.

Kosovo
In Kosovo, four teams have won the Double of the Superleague (1999–present) and the Kosovar Cup (1999–present).

Latvia
In Latvia, three teams have won the Double of the Latvian Higher League and the Latvian Football Cup.

Liechtenstein
There is no national league in Liechtenstein, as its clubs partake in the neighbouring Swiss football league system; the Liechtenstein Football Cup is the only national football competition in the country.

Lithuania
In Lithuania six teams have won the Double of the A Lyga and the Lithuanian Football Cup.

Note: Žalgiris won domestic cup twice in 2016, due to format change.

Luxembourg
In Luxembourgian football, the Double is made up of the National Division title and the Luxembourg Cup. As there are no other senior football competitions in the country, and no club have never come close to winning any European tournament, the Double is the ultimate achievement for a Luxembourgian club in one season.

The most successful clubs are Jeunesse Esch and F91 Dudelange, who have completed eight Doubles each.

Malta
In Malta, six teams have won the Double of the Maltese Premier League and the Maltese FA Trophy.

Moldova
Sheriff Tiraspol were only founded in 1997, but have come to dominate the Moldovan game, winning every title from 2001 to 2010 inclusive. Seven of these were double wins (Moldovan National Division and Moldovan Cup). Sheriff, however, have never won the Moldovan Super Cup in any of their Double-winning years, though one reason for this was the Super Cup was not played in 2009 and 2010. One other club, Zimbru Chișinău, has won the double, in 1998.

Montenegro
In Montenegro, only two teams have won the Double of the Montenegrin First League and the Montenegrin Cup.

Netherlands
In the Netherlands, six teams have won the Double of the Eredivisie and the KNVB Cup.

Note: Ajax's 1972 Double were part of the club's Treble which also included their European Cup victory.

Note: PSV's 1988 Double were part of the club's Treble which also included their European Cup victory.

Northern Ireland
In Northern Ireland, seven teams have won the Double of the Irish League/Premier League/Premiership and the Irish Cup.

North Macedonia
In North Macedonia, five teams have won the Double of the Macedonian First Football League and the Macedonian Football Cup.

Norway
In Norway, seven teams have won the Double of the Eliteserien and the Norwegian Football Cup.

Poland
In Poland, five teams have won the Double of the Ekstraklasa and the Polish Cup.

Until now, Legia Warsaw is the only team to achieve Domestic Treble by winning the two trophies and the Polish SuperCup title.

Portugal
In Portugal, the Double is called "Dobradinha" and is achieved by winning the Primeira Liga and the Taça de Portugal. Only the "Big Three" have done so since the nationwide round-robin league competition was introduced in 1934.

Benfica holds the record of eleven Doubles. Sporting CP was the first side to achieve the Double, in 1941, and the most recent one was Porto, in 2022.

Republic of Ireland
In Ireland, the double is achieved by winning the League of Ireland and FAI Cup. Bohemians managed a similar feat in 1928 season by winning the League, FAI Cup, the League of Ireland Shield and the Leinster Senior Cup. Derry City FC completed 'The Treble' in 1988–89 by also winning the League of Ireland Cup.

Romania
In Romania, the Double is called the Event and can be achieved by winning the Liga I and the Cupa României. The team that has won the most doubles to date is Steaua București, with nine wins, followed by their city rivals, Dinamo București with six wins. In recent times, CFR Cluj has won the Double twice, being the fourth non-Bucharest team to do so, after Universitatea Craiova, UTA Arad and Ripensia Timişoara.

Note: Steaua București initially won the double in 1987–88 but voluntarily gave up their Cupa României title.

Russia
Four Russian teams achieved the Double of the Soviet Top League and the USSR Cup in the former Soviet Union. The final Soviet championship was contested in 1991 and, following the break-up of the Soviet Union, newly independent states organised their own national competitions, with UEFA regarding the Russian Premier League and the Russian Cup as the respective successors to the old Soviet league and USSR Cup.

San Marino
In San Marino six teams have won the Double of the Campionato Sammarinese di Calcio and the Coppa Titano.

Scotland
Three teams have accomplished the double of the Scottish league championship and the Scottish Cup. Only Aberdeen have managed to break the Old Firm trend, during their stint of success in the 1980s.

Note: Celtic's 1967 Double was part of the club's Quintuple which also included their European Cup victory.

Serbia
Two teams in the current Republic of Serbia have won the Double of the Yugoslav First League and Yugoslav Cup (1923–92), the First League of FR Yugoslavia/Serbia and Montenegro and FR Yugoslavia/Serbia and Montenegro Cup (1992–2006), and the Serbian SuperLiga and Serbian Cup (2006–present).

Slovakia
In Slovakia, seven teams have won the Double of the Czechoslovak First League/Slovak Super Liga and the Czechoslovak Cup/Slovak Cup.

Slovenia
In Slovenia, three teams have won the Double of the Slovenian PrvaLiga and the Slovenian Football Cup.

Spain
In Spain, four teams have won the Double (Doblete) of La Liga and the Copa del Rey.

Note: Barcelona's 2009 and 2015 Doubles were part of the club's Trebles which also included their UEFA Champions League victories.

Sweden
In Sweden, six teams have won the Double of the Swedish championship and the Svenska Cupen.

The Svenska Cupen was not introduced until the 1941 season, while Allsvenskan started for the 1923–24 season. Svenska Cupen was also not played between 1954 and 1966. It should also be considered that winning Allsvenskan did not grant the title of Swedish champions until 1931 and between 1982 and 1992 when the title was given to the winner of other cup tournaments that were organized at the end of the league season. The number of doubles for IFK Göteborg and Malmö FF are affected by this. IFK Göteborg won the Swedish Championship together with Svenska Cupen in one additional season to the table below, they won the two titles in 1983, a year when they did not win Allsvenskan. Additionally while Malmö won Allsvenskan in 1989, they were not Swedish Championships for that season as they did not win the play-off following the ordinary league play. All other teams in the table below won the Swedish Championship in their double-winning seasons. The latest club to win a double is AIK who completed the feat in 2009. In 1982, IFK Göteborg also managed to combine its double with winning the UEFA Cup.

Switzerland
In Switzerland, eight teams have won the Double of the Swiss Super League and the Swiss Cup.

Turkey
In Turkey, four teams have won the Double of the Süper Lig and the Turkish Cup.

Note: Galatasaray's 2000 Double was part of the club's Minor treble which also included their UEFA Cup victory.

Ukraine
Prior to the breakup of the Soviet Union, Ukrainian clubs were part of Soviet competition. Since 1992, the country has had its own domestic competition. Dynamo Kyiv has four Soviet and nine Ukrainian Doubles among its honours.

In Ukraine, two teams have won the Double of the Soviet Top League/Ukrainian Premier League and the Soviet Cup/Ukrainian Cup.

Wales
In Wales, seven teams have won the Double of the Division One (1904–92) / Welsh Premier League (1992–present) and the Welsh Cup.
Achieving this and also winning the Welsh League Cup would make a domestic Treble. To date, two clubs have achieved the Treble. Rhyl achieved a domestic quadruple in 2003–04, winning the Welsh Premier, Welsh Cup, Welsh Premier League Cup and North Wales Challenge Cup. They narrowly missed out on a clean sweep of five trophies losing the Welsh Premier Cup Final to Wrexham.

 Rhyl's 2003/04 double was part of a domestic treble of Welsh Premier League, Welsh Cup and Welsh Premier League Cup

South America

Argentina
Boca Juniors are the only club to simultaneously win the Argentine Primera División and the Copa Argentina, doing so in 1969 and 2015.

Bolivia
Club Bolívar are the only club to complete the double having won both the Liga de Fútbol Profesional Boliviano and Copa Aerosur (defunct) in 2009.

Brazil
Due to the large size of the country and the late development of the transportion and communication infrastructure needed to support it, a nationwide competition did not emerge until 1959. For 30 years, a domestic double was not possible since there existed only one national tournament. An exception was the 1967 season, when Palmeiras won the double consisting of the inaugural Torneio Roberto Gomes Pedrosa and the final edition of the Taça Brasil.

Since the founding of the Copa do Brasil in 1989, there has been two teams that won both the Copa do Brasil and the Campeonato Brasileiro Série A.

Chile
Two teams have won the Chilean double of the Chilean Primera División and Copa Chile.

Colombia
Millonarios is the first Colombian club to win the double, taking both the Categoría Primera A and Copa Colombia in 1953 and 1963.
Nacional became the second club in Colombia winning the double, taking both the Categoría Primera A (Apertura and Clausura) and Copa Colombia in 2013.

Ecuador
Cup was made in 2019

Paraguay
In Paraguay, there is no national cup; the Paraguayan Primera División is the only national football competition in the country.

Peru
In Peru, there is no national cup; the Peruvian Primera División is the only national football competition in the country.

Uruguay
In Uruguay, three teams have won the Double of the Uruguayan Primera División and the Copa de Competencia (defunct).

Venezuela
To complete the double, a club must win the Venezuelan Primera División and the Copa Venezuela.

CONCACAF

Anguilla
In Anguilla, there is no national cup; the Anguillan League is the only national football competition in the country.

Antigua and Barbuda
In Antigua and Barbuda, two teams have won the Double of the Premier Division and the FA Cup.

Aruba
In Aruba, two teams have won the Double of the Division di Honor and the Torneo Copa Betico Croes.

Bahamas
In the Bahamas, two teams have won the Double of the Senior League and the President's Cup.

Barbados
In Barbados, seven teams have won the Double of the Barbados Premier Division and the Barbados FA Cup.

Belize
In Belize, there is no national cup, the Premier League is the only national football competition in the country.

Bermuda
In Bermuda, seven teams have won the Double of the Bermudian Premier Division and the Bermuda FA Cup.

Bonaire
In Bonaire, only one team has won the Double of the Bonaire League and the Kopa MCB.

British Virgin Islands
There is no national cup in the British Virgin Islands, the BVIFA National Football League is the only national football competition in the country.

Canada
Top-level Canadian clubs either compete in the domestic Canadian Premier League (CPL), or Major League Soccer (MLS) of the United States. The Canadian Championship is the country's national cup and is contested between CPL teams, the three Canadian MLS teams, and the champions of the regional pro-am leagues.

For MLS teams, the Double may mean either the MLS Double, which is achieved by winning both the Supporters' Shield and the MLS Cup, or a league/cup Double of either the MLS Cup or Supporters' Shield, in addition to the Canadian Championship.

For CPL teams, a Double would include winning the CPL Championship and the Canadian Championship.

The 2017 Double achieved by Toronto FC was part of a Treble.

Cayman Islands
Five teams from the Cayman Islands have won the double of the Cayman Islands League and the Cayman Islands FA Cup.

Costa Rica
In Costa Rica, no team has won the double of the Costa Rican Primera División and the Costa Rican Cup.

Cuba
In Cuba, there is no national cup; the Campeonato Nacional is the only national football competition in the country.

Curaçao
In Curaçao, there is no national cup, the Curaçao League is the only national football competition in the country.

Dominica
In Dominica, two teams have won the Double of the Dominica Premiere League and the Dominica Knock-Out Tournament (defunct).

Dominican Republic
In the Dominican Republic, there is no national cup; the Primera División is the only national football competition in the country.

El Salvador
In El Salvador, two teams have won the Double of the Primera División and the Copa El Salvador.

French Guiana
In French Guiana, four teams have won the Double of the French Guiana Championnat National and the Coupe de Guyane.

Grenada
In Grenada, is no national cup, the Grenada League is the only national football competition in the country.

Guadeloupe
In Guadeloupe, six teams have won the Double of the Guadeloupe Division d'Honneur and the Coupe de Guadeloupe.

Guatemala
In Guatemala, three teams have won the Double of the Liga Nacional de Fútbol de Guatemala and the Copa de Guatemala (defunct).

Guyana
In Guyana, only one team has won the Double of the National Super League and the Guyana Mayors Cup.

Haiti
In Haiti, four teams have won the Double of the Ligue Haïtienne and the Coupe d'Haïti.

Honduras
Club Deportivo Olimpia are the only club to complete the double having won both the Liga Nacional and Honduran Cup in 2015 respectively.

Jamaica
In Jamaica, three teams have won the Double of the National Premier League and the Champions Cup.

Martinique
In Martinique, three teams have won the Double of the Martinique Championnat National and the Coupe de la Martinique.

Mexico
In Mexico, nine teams have won the Double of the Primera Fuerza / Liga MX and the Copa MX.

Montserrat
In Montserrat, no team has won the Double of the Montserrat Championship and the Montserrat Cup.

Nicaragua
In Nicaragua, two teams have won the Double of the Nicaraguan Primera División and the Copa de Nicaragua (defunct).

Panama
In Panama, no team has won the Double of the Liga Panameña and the Copa Panamá.

Puerto Rico
In Puerto Rico only one team has won the Double of the Liga Nacional and the Torneo de Copa (defunct).

Saint Kitts and Nevis
In Saint Kitts and Nevis, four teams have won the Double of the Saint Kitts Premier Division and the Saint Kitts and Nevis National Cup.

And no team has won the Double of the Nevis Premier Division and the Saint Kitts and Nevis National Cup.

Saint Lucia
In Saint Lucia, two teams have won the Double of the Saint Lucia Gold Division and the Saint Lucia FA Cup.

Saint Vincent and the Grenadines
In Saint Vincent and the Grenadines, is no national cup; the NLA Premier League is the only national football competition in the country.

Sint Maarten
In Sint Maarten, there is no national cup; the Sint Maarten League is the only national football competition in the country.

Suriname
In Suriname, three teams have won the Double of the Topklasse and the Surinamese Cup.

Trinidad and Tobago
In Trinidad and Tobago, 13 teams have won the Double of the Port of Spain Football League / National League / Semi-Professional League / TT Pro League and the Trinidad and Tobago Cup.

Turks and Caicos Islands
In Turks and Caicos Islands, is no national cup; the Provo Premier League is the only national football competition in the country.

United States

Men
In the United States, the Double consists of the MLS Cup and either the Supporters' Shield or the U.S. Open Cup or Canadian Championship for United States and Canadian clubs, respectively. The Double may also be a combination of any of the domestic cups mentioned above and the CONCACAF Champions League. No team based in the United States has achieved the Treble of both MLS honours and a domestic cup in the same season although Toronto FC, who play in MLS but are based in Canada, won a Treble in 2017.

The following is a list of doubles in the United States in the MLS era:

Women
There is no currently sanctioned National Cup in the United States for women, so the only way to achieve the Double in the United States is through a league double (winning the Shield or its equivalent for the best regular-season record, and the league championship).

The Women's United Soccer Association did not have formal recognition of the team with the best regular season record, but during the 2002 WUSA season, the Carolina Courage had the best regular season record and won the Founder's Cup, the WUSA Championship Trophy.

Women's Professional Soccer, which operated from 2009 to 2011, had one club win both the regular season championship and the WPS Championship (the latter through the playoffs): During the 2011 Women's Professional Soccer season, the Western New York Flash had the best regular season record, and won in the Championship match on 27 August 2011 to win the WPS Championship and the double.

The National Women's Soccer League did not see a double in its first five seasons (2013–2017). However, in both its 2018 and 2019 seasons, the North Carolina Courage won both the NWSL Shield (awarded to the team with the best regular-season record) and the NWSL Championship (earned by winning in the NWSL Playoffs).

United States Virgin Islands
In the United States Virgin Islands, there is no national cup; the U.S. Virgin Islands Championship is the only national football competition in the country.

Oceania

Australia
From 1977 to 1997, the double could be achieved in Australia by winning the National Soccer League and the NSL Cup.

Between 1997 and 2014, Australia had no national cup competition so the traditional league and cup double could not be achieved. Since the formation of the A-League in 2004, a double could be accomplished by winning the Premiership in the regular league season and the Championship in the finals series. The feat of winning the minor premiership and the finals during the NSL era was not officially recognised as a 'double'.

From 2014–15, the FFA Cup takes place on an annual basis.

1977–2004

2005–present

American Samoa
In American Samoa, two teams have won the Double of the FFAS Senior League and the FFAS President's Cup (defunct).

Cook Islands
In Cook Islands, five teams have won the Double of the Cook Islands Round Cup and the Cook Islands Cup.

Fiji
In Fiji, two teams have won the Double of the League Championship (for Districts) and the FFA Cup.

New Caledonia
In New Caledonia, six teams have won the Double of the New Caledonia Super Ligue and the New Caledonia Cup.

New Zealand
Between 1970 and 2003, five New Zealand teams have won the double of the national championship (New Zealand National Soccer League (1970–92 and 2000–04), Superclub competition (1993–95), National Summer Soccer League (1996–98) or the New Zealand island soccer leagues National Final (1999)) and the Chatham Cup. From 1993 to 2003, the league champions were determined by a knockout tournament between the top-finishing teams at the end of the season, the team that finished in first place during the league phase of the season were not officially awarded a title.

From 2003, the league system in the country was drastically restructured and saw the National Soccer League disband, with its teams now competing on a regional basis. The New Zealand Football Championship was formed and became the country's national league, exclusively run for franchised teams as opposed to the traditional clubs that competed in the National Soccer League.

As with most franchise leagues, the Football Championship wass split into two phases; the Premiership during the regular season and the Championship during the finals phase, which was contested between the top four-placed teams of the Premiership phase. The franchises were ineligible to participate in the Chatham Cup. From 2021 onwards this system was replaced by the New Zealand National League, with the Chatham Cup as its primary cup, and the fanchises were disbanded.

1970–2003

2004–2021

2021–present

Palau
In Palau, there is no national cup; the Palau Soccer League is the only national football competition in the country.

Papua New Guinea
In Papua New Guinea, there is no national cup; the Papua New Guinea Overall Championship is the only national football competition in the country.

Samoa
In Samoa, two teams have won the Double of the Samoa National League and the Samoa Cup.

Solomon Islands
In Solomon Islands, is no national cup; the Telekom S-League is the only national football competition in the country.

Tahiti
In Tahiti, nine teams have won the Double of the Tahiti First Division and the Tahiti Cup.

Tonga
In Tonga, only one team has won the Double of the Tonga Major League and the Tonga Cup (defunct).

Asia

Afghanistan
In Afghanistan, there are no national cups. The Afghan Premier League is the only national football competition in the country since 2012.

Bahrain
In Bahrain three teams have won the Double of the Bahraini Premier League and the Bahraini King's Cup.

Bangladesh
In Bangladesh four teams have won the Double of the National Football Championship / Bangladesh Premier League and the Federation Cup.

Bhutan
Bhutan has no national cup, the Bhutan National League is the only national football competition in the country.

Brunei
In Brunei, two teams have won the Double of the Brunei Premier League / Brunei Super League and the Brunei FA Cup.

Cambodia
In Cambodia only one team has won the Double of the Cambodian League and the Hun Sen Cup.

China
In China, three teams have won the Double of the Chinese Jia-A League / Chinese Super League and the Chinese FA Cup.

Chinese Taipei
In Chinese Taipei, two teams have won the Double of the Enterprise Football League / Intercity Football League and the CTFA Cup.

East Timor
Now in East Timor there is no national cup, the Super Liga Timorense is the only national football competition in the country.

Guam
In Guam two teams have won the Double of the Guam Men's Soccer League and the Guam FA Cup.

Hong Kong
In Hong Kong, nine teams have won the Double of the Hong Kong First Division League and the Hong Kong Senior Challenge Shield.

India
In India, three teams have won the Double of the National Football League (now I-League) / Indian Super League and the Federation Cup (now Super Cup).

Indonesia
In Indonesia only one team has won the Double of the Indonesia Super League / Indonesian Premier League and the Piala Indonesia.

Iran
In Iran, two teams have won the Double of the Azadegan League / Iran Pro League and the Hazfi Cup.

Iraq
In Iraq, four teams have won the Double of the Iraqi Premier League and the Iraq FA Cup.

Japan
The Japanese Double is generally considered to be winning the league championship (the Japan Soccer League Division 1 until 1991–92 and the J.League Division 1 since then) and the Emperor's Cup. Winning the second division title and the Emperor's Cup is rarer.

First Division and Emperor's Cup

Second Division and Emperor's Cup

Jordan
In Jordan, three teams have won the Double of the Jordan Premier League and the Jordan FA Cup.

North Korea
In North Korea, three teams have won the Double of the DPR Korea League and the DPRK Championships / Hwaebul Cup.

South Korea
In South Korea, two teams have won the Double of the First Division and the Korean National Football Championship in semi-professional era. In professional era, two teams have won the K League 1 and the FA Cup and three teams have won the Double of the K League 1 and the League Cup.

First Division and National Football Championship

First Division and FA Cup

FA Cup and AFC Champions League (former Asian Club Championship)

Kyrgyzstan
In Kyrgyzstan, three teams have won the Double of the Kyrgyzstan League and the Kyrgyzstan Cup.

Kuwait
In Kuwait, three teams have won the Double of the Kuwaiti Premier League and the Kuwait Emir Cup.

Laos
In Laos, two teams have won the Double of the Lao Premier League and the Laotian Prime Minister's Cup.

Lebanon
In Lebanon, six teams have won the Double of the Lebanese Premier League and the Lebanese FA Cup.

Macau

In Macau, only one team has won the Double of the Campeonato da 1ª Divisão and the Taça de Macau.

Malaysia
In Malaysia, eight teams have won the Double of the Malaysia League / Malaysia Semi-Pro League / Malaysia Premier League / Malaysia Super League and the Malaysia Cup or Malaysia FA Cup.

Maldives
In Maldives, four teams have won the Double of the Maldives National Championship (1980–1999) / Dhivehi League (2000–present) and the Maldives FA Cup.

Mongolia
In Mongolia, only one team has won the Double of the Niislel League and the Mongolia Cup.

Myanmar
In Myanmar, two teams have won the Double of the Myanmar National League and the General Aung San Shield.

Northern Mariana Islands
In the Northern Mariana Islands, only one team has won the double of the M*League Division 1 and the Northern Mariana Cup.

Oman
In Oman four teams have won the Double of the Omani League and the Sultan Qaboos Cup.

Pakistan
In Pakistan, three teams have won the Double of the Pakistan Premier League and the Pakistan National Football Challenge Cup.

Philippines
Due to the sporadic nature of football competitions in the country, with a league not in place until the 21st century, and only the United Football League (UFL) to last more than a season, and a national cup competition not being consistently held annually, achieving a double has been mostly impossible until recently. The establishment of the UFL in 2009 led to annual league and cup tournaments. The institution of the PFF National Men's Club Championship (the national cup) in 2011 (next held in 2013) after years of dormancy meant that a domestic treble could now be contested. In 2013, a super cup is expected to be played, paving the way for a UFL treble.

During the existence of the UFL from 2009 to 2016, a league double has been achieved thrice. A domestic double (a title each from the UFL and the PFF) or a domestic treble (a UFL double and a PFF title) has not been won.

Qatar
In Qatar, three teams have won the Double of the Qatar Stars League and the Emir of Qatar Cup.

Saudi Arabia
In Saudi Arabia, five teams have won the Double of the Saudi Professional League and the King's Cup (1956–1990, 2008–present) / Crown Prince Cup (1990–2007).

Singapore
In Singapore, four teams have won the Double of the S.League and the Singapore Cup.

Sri Lanka
In Sri Lanka, three teams have won the Double of the Sri Lanka Football Premier League and the Sri Lanka FA Cup.

Syria
In Syria, six teams have won the Double of the Syrian Premier League and the Syrian Cup.

Tajikistan
In Tajikistan, six teams have won the Double of the Tajik League and the Tajik Cup.

Thailand
In Thailand, two teams have won the Double of the Kor Royal Cup (1916–1995)/Thai Premier League (1996–present) and the Thai FA Cup.

Turkmenistan
In Turkmenistan, three teams have won the Double of the Ýokary Liga and the Turkmenistan Cup.

United Arab Emirates
In the United Arab Emirates, five teams have won the Double of the UAE Arabian Gulf League and the UAE President's Cup.

Uzbekistan
In Uzbekistan, five teams have won the Double of the Uzbek League and the Uzbekistan Cup.

Vietnam
In Vietnam, four teams have won the Double of the V.League 1 and the Vietnamese National Cup.

Yemen
In Yemen, four teams have won the Double of the North Yemen Champions/Yemeni League and the Cup of the Republic / Yemeni President Cup.

Africa

Algeria
In Algeria, five teams have won the Double of the Algerian Ligue Professionnelle 1 and the Algerian Cup.

Angola
In Angola, three teams have won the Double of the Girabola and the Taça de Angola.

Benin
In Benin, two teams have won the Double of the Benin Premier League and the Benin Cup.

Botswana
In Botswana, seven teams have won the Double of the Botswana Premier League and the FA Challenge Cup.

Burkina Faso
In Burkina Faso, three teams have won the Double of the Burkinabé Premier League and the Coupe du Faso.

Burundi
In Burundi, only one team has won the Double of the Burundi Premier League and the Burundian Cup.

Cameroon
In Cameroon five teams have won the Double of the Elite One and the Cameroonian Cup.

Cape Verde
In Cape Verde, only one team has won the Double of the Campeonato Nacional de Cabo Verde and the Taça Nacional de Cabo Verde.

Central African Republic
In Central African Republic, only one team has won the Double of the CAR League and the CAR Coupe Nationale.

Chad
In Chad, no team has won the Double of the Chad Premier League and the Chad Cup.

Comoros
In Comoros, two teams have won the Double of the Comoros Premier League and the Comoros Cup.

Democratic Republic of the Congo
In the Democratic Republic of the Congo, six teams have won the Double of the Linafoot and the Coupe du Congo.

Republic of the Congo
In the Republic of the Congo, three teams have won the Double of the Congo Premier League and the Coupe du Congo.

Djibouti
In Djibouti, four teams have won the Double of the Djibouti Premier League and the Djibouti Cup.

Egypt
In Egypt, two teams have won the Double of the Egyptian Premier League and the Egypt Cup.

Equatorial Guinea
In Equatorial Guinea, no team has won the Double of the Equatoguinean Premier League and the Equatoguinean Cup.

Eritrea
In Eritrea, no team has won the Double of the Eritrean Premier League and the Eritrean Cup.

Ethiopia
In Ethiopia, three teams have won the Double of the Ethiopian Premier League and the Ethiopian Cup.

Gabon
In Gabon, five teams have won the Double of the Gabon Championnat National D1 and the Coupe du Gabon Interclubs.

The Gambia
In The Gambia, two teams have won the Double of the GFA League First Division and the Gambian Cup.

Ghana
In Ghana, three teams have won the Double of the Ghana Premier League and the Ghanaian FA Cup.

Guinea
In Guinea, two teams have won the Double of the Guinée Championnat National and the Guinée Coupe Nationale.

Guinea-Bissau
In Guinea-Bissau, three teams have won the Double of the Campeonato Nacional da Guiné-Bissau and the Taça Nacional da Guiné Bissau.

Ivory Coast
In the Ivory Coast, two teams have won the Double of the Ligue 1 and the Coupe de Côte d'Ivoire.

Kenya
In Kenya, two teams have won the Double of the Kenyan Premier League and the President's Cup.

Lesotho
In Lesotho, five teams have won the Double of the Lesotho Premier League and the Lesotho Independence Cup.

Liberia
In Liberia, eight teams have won the Double of the Liberian Premier League and the Liberian Cup.

Libya
In Libya, two teams have won the Double of the Libyan Premier League and the Libyan Cup.

Madagascar
In Madagascar, four teams have won the Double of the THB Champions League and the Coupe de Madagascar.

Malawi
In Malawi, only one team has won the Double of the Malawi Premier Division and the Malawi FAM Cup.

Mali
In Mali, three teams have won the Double of the Malian Première Division and the Malian Cup.

Mauritania
In Mauritania, two teams have won the Double of the Ligue 1 Mauritania and the Coupe du Président de la République.

Mauritius
In Mauritius, seven teams have won the Double of the Mauritian League and the Mauritian Cup.

Morocco
In Morocco, three teams have won the Double of the Botola and the Coupe du Trône.

Mozambique
In Mozambique, five teams have won the Double of the Moçambola and the Taça de Moçambique.

Namibia
In Namibia, only one team has won the Double of the Namibia Premier League and the NFA Cup.

Niger
In Niger, eight teams have won the Double of the Niger Premier League and the Niger Cup.

Nigeria
In Nigeria, seven teams have won the Double of the Nigeria Premier League and the Nigerian FA Cup.

Rwanda
In Rwanda, three teams have won the Double of the Primus National Football League and the Rwandan Cup.

São Tomé and Príncipe
In São Tomé and Príncipe, six teams have won the Double of the São Tomé and Príncipe Championship and the Taça Nacional de São Tomé e Príncipe.

Senegal
In Senegal, three teams have won the Double of the Senegal Premier League and the Senegal FA Cup.

Seychelles
In Seychelles, two teams have won the Double of the Seychelles First Division and the Seychelles FA Cup.

Sierra Leone
In Sierra Leone, two teams have won the Double of the Sierra Leone National Premier League and the Sierra Leonean FA Cup.

Somalia
In Somalia, no team has won the Double of the Somalia League and the Somalia Cup.

South Africa
In South Africa, 13 teams have won the Double of the NFL / SASL / FPL / NPSL / NSL / South African Premier Division and the NFL Cup / SASF Cup / Nedbank Cup.

South Sudan
In South Sudan, only one team has won the Double of the South Sudan Football Championship and the South Sudan National Cup.

Sudan
In Sudan, two teams have won the Double of the Sudan Premier League and the Sudan Cup.

Swaziland
In Swaziland, two teams have won the Double of the Swazi Premier League and the Swazi Cup.

Tanzania
In Tanzania, three teams have won the Double of the Tanzanian Premier League and the Nyerere Cup/Tanzania FA Cup.

Togo
In Togo, five teams have won the Double of the Togolese Championnat National and the Coupe du Togo.

Tunisia
In Tunisia, ten teams have won the Double of the Tunisian Ligue Professionnelle 1 and the Tunisian Cup.

Uganda
In Uganda, three teams have won the Double of the Ugandan Super League and the Ugandan Cup.

Zambia
In Zambia, six teams have won the Double of the Zambian Premier League and the Zambian Cup (defunct).

Zimbabwe
In Zimbabwe, six teams have won the Double of the Zimbabwe Premier Soccer League and the Cup of Zimbabwe.

Other countries

Greenland
The Greenlandic Football Championship is the only national football competition in the country.

Kiribati
In Kiribati, there is no national cup; the Kiribati National Championship is the only national football competition in the country.

Northern Cyprus
In Northern Cyprus, five teams have won the Double of the Birinci Lig and the Kıbrıs Kupası/Federasyon Kupası.

Réunion
In Réunion, four teams have won the Double of the Réunion Premier League and the Coupe de la Réunion.

Zanzibar
In Zanzibar, only one team has won the Double of the Zanzibar Premier League and the Nyerere Cup.

League and League Cup Double
A rarer (though less coveted) domestic double is that of winning the league championship and the League Cup. In many leagues, this cannot be done as there is no second domestic cup competition (such as in Italy and the Netherlands) or it has been disbanded (such as in Spain and Denmark). The format of league cups and the number of participating teams can vary enormously from one country to another. In the case of Germany, the DFB-Ligapokal was played in the summer months prior to the Bundesliga and therefore was won in the preceding calendar year to the title win.

Doubles in lower divisions

In many countries, knock-out competitions exclusive to clubs outside the top division(s) also exist. This gives lower ranked clubs a chance to win a double. Examples include:

Trans-state double
A Trans-state double occurs when a club wins a league and a cup which technically belong to two different countries and different associations. This usually happens as a result of a change in the political situation in the club's home country, or if the club has expatriated and is eligible to participate in the competitions of its native country and its adopted one.

Trans-state league double

Trans-state cup double

Continental double

European double
In the same spirit as the European treble, the European double consists of winning the top tier European tournament (currently the UEFA Champions League) and domestic league title in a single season or calendar year. This has been achieved on 29 occasions by 15 clubs from 56 European competitions. Barcelona has achieved this on the most occasions (5). Ajax and Real Madrid are the only teams that have successfully defended a European double. José Mourinho has the unique distinction of being the only manager to achieve this double with two different clubs, having done so with Porto (2004) and Internazionale (2010).

 (*) as part of a treble

The unbeaten double
In 1994–95, Louis van Gaal's Ajax, with players such as Jari Litmanen, Patrick Kluivert, Marc Overmars, Finidi George, Nwankwo Kanu, Frank de Boer, Ronald de Boer, Edgar Davids, Clarence Seedorf, Winston Bogarde, Michael Reiziger and Edwin van der Sar, succeeded an unbeaten double, winning the Dutch Eredivisie with a 27–7–0 record and the UEFA Champions League with a 7–4–0 record. Van Gaal's dream team was the only club to achieve a European double with no defeats.

League and Europa League double
The UEFA Europa League (formerly the UEFA Cup), with a domestic league title win, offers the chance for a club to win a lesser European double; but arguably a more prestigious achievement than a domestic double. This has been completed on fourteen occasions.

 In 1987, Göteborg finished third in the Allsvenskan. At this time, the title was decided by a play-off between the top four teams. They defeated first placed Malmö FF in the play-off final.

League and Cup Winners' Cup double
Similarly, there were six occasions of clubs winning their League and the now defunct UEFA Cup Winners' Cup (CWC). No club ever won the CWC as part of a recognised treble. In the case of 1. FC Magdeburg and Dynamo Kyiv, it is also worth noting that the domestic championships they won are also now disbanded, due to German reunification and the dissolution of the Soviet Union respectively.

Continental doubles outside of Europe
Outside Europe, the continental double might be won in a calendar year rather than a single season.

Cup double
There are various possible combinations of winning two knock-out competitions.

Domestic cup couble
A Domestic cup double consists of winning both domestic cup competitions in a single season or calendar year (for seasons when this double was won in conjunction with the league title, see domestic treble). Examples include:

European cup double
There have been several occasions when a club has won its association's cup or league cup and a UEFA trophy but not its League title. For European cup doubles won in conjunction with the league title, see the treble.

 A unique cup treble.

Continental cup doubles outside of Europe

Other
A combination of domestic league or cup and a lesser domestic or continental trophy may be won in the same season. Examples include (this list does not include doubles achieved as part of a treble):

 Barcelona's 1960 team won both La Liga and the Inter-Cities Fairs Cup.
 Zaragoza won an Inter-Cities Fairs Cup and Copa del Rey double in the 1963–64 season.
 Leeds United were the first English team to win a double involving European and domestic trophies. It was in 1968 when Leeds won the Football League Cup and Inter-Cities Fairs Cup.
 Dinamo Tbilisi won the Georgian Cup and CIS Cup in 2004.
 Espanyol won the Copa del Rey and Copa Catalunya in 2006. This would not normally be counted as a domestic cup double comparable to those mentioned above, as the latter competition is not nationwide or league-wide.
 Copenhagen won the Danish Superliga and the pan-Scandinavian Royal League in 2006.
 FBK Kaunas won the Lithuanian Football Cup and Baltic League in 2008.
 Al-Quwa Al-Jawiya won the Iraq FA Cup and AFC Cup in 2016.
 Al-Quwa Al-Jawiya won the Iraqi Premier League and AFC Cup in 2017.
 Mumbai City won the ISL Championship and ISL Premiership in the 2020–21 season.

International double
A national team cannot usually win a FIFA World Cup and their continental championship in the same year because they are usually not held in the same year (except for the Africa Cup of Nations until 2010), but one which wins both titles consecutively could be said to have "done the double".

World and continental champions
 won the gold medal at the 1924 Summer Olympics and the 1924 South American Championship. (Prior to the FIFA World Cup's foundation in 1930, the Olympic champions were considered to be the world champions).
 won UEFA Euro 1972 and the 1974 FIFA World Cup
 won the 1998 FIFA World Cup, UEFA Euro 2000 and the 2001 FIFA Confederations Cup
 won the 2002 FIFA World Cup, the 2004 Copa América and the 2005 FIFA Confederations Cup 
 won UEFA Euro 2008, the 2010 FIFA World Cup and UEFA Euro 2012
 won the 2021 Copa América and the 2022 FIFA World Cup

World and other tournament champions
 won the 1933–35 Central European International Cup and the 1934 FIFA World Cup
 won the 1956 Panamerican Championship and the 1958 FIFA World Cup
 won the 1965–66 British Home Championship and the 1966 FIFA World Cup
 won the 2014 FIFA World Cup and the 2017 FIFA Confederations Cup
 won the 2018 FIFA World Cup and the 2020–21 UEFA Nations League

Continental and other tournament champions
 won the 1970 RCD Cup and the 1972 AFC Asian Cup
 won the 1982 African Cup of Nations, 1982 West African Nations Cup and 1983 West African Nations Cup
 won the 1991 CEDEAO Cup and the 1992 African Cup of Nations
 won the 1991 Copa América, the 1992 King Fahd Cup and the 1993 Copa América
 won the 1996 AFC Asian Cup and the 1998 Arab Nations Cup
 won the 1997 Copa América and the 1997 FIFA Confederations Cup
 won the 1998 CONCACAF Gold Cup and the 1999 FIFA Confederations Cup
 won the 2000 African Cup of Nations, the 2002 African Cup of Nations and the 2003 CEMAC Cup
 won the 2005 West Asian Games and the 2007 AFC Asian Cup
 won the 2007 Copa América and the 2009 FIFA Confederations Cup
 won the 2011 AFC Asian Cup and the 2013 EAFF East Asian Cup
 won UEFA Euro 2016 and the 2018–19 UEFA Nations League
 won the 2019 WAFU Cup of Nations and the 2021 Africa Cup of Nations
 won the 2019–20 CONCACAF Nations League and the 2021 CONCACAF Gold Cup
 won the 2019 Africa Cup of Nations and the 2021 FIFA Arab Cup

Total number of doubles

Double winning managers

 As manager of Preston North End in 1888–89, William Sudell won the inaugural First Division title, going unbeaten in the league (22 games), and won the FA Cup without conceding a goal in that competition.
 Jock Stein won the double on nine occasions with Celtic between 1967 and 1977: four doubles of the Scottish league championship and the Scottish Cup, three doubles of the Scottish league championship and the Scottish League Cup and two Trebles.
 Sir Alex Ferguson won the double on four occasions; with Aberdeen in 1983–84, and with Manchester United in 1993–94, 1995–96 and 1998–99. This achievement makes him the only manager to win the double on both sides of the Anglo-Scottish border.
 Sven-Göran Eriksson is the only manager to win a domestic double in three different countries, having done so in Sweden, Portugal and Italy with IFK Göteborg (1981–82), Benfica (1982–83) and Lazio (1999–2000) respectively. This included back-to-back double wins in separate countries.
 Louis van Gaal won the double with Barcelona in 1997–98 and Bayern Munich in 2009–10, subsequent to his undefeated European Double with Ajax in 1994–95.
 Massimiliano Allegri became the first manager in Italy to win the double four consecutive times, in 2014–15, 2015–16, 2016–17 and 2017–18, all with Juventus.

See also
The Treble
List of association football teams to have won four or more trophies in one season

References

Association football terminology
Association football records and statistics